Jack Parker may refer to:
Jack Parker (ice hockey) (born 1945), ice hockey coach and former player
Jack Parker (cinematographer) (1885–?), British film technician
Jack Parker (speedway rider) (1907–1990), British
Jack Parker (footballer, born 1911) (1911–2003), Australian footballer for North Melbourne
Jack Parker (cricketer) (1913–1983), British 
Jack Parker (decathlete) (1915–1964), American decathlete 
Jack Parker (hurdler) (1927–2022), British hurdler
Jack Parker (footballer, born 1931) (1931–2003), Australian footballer for Collingwood
Jack Parker (boxer) (1915–1993), New Zealand boxer
Jack Parker (musician) (born c. 1970s), American musician in David Crowder Band
Jack Parker, a fictional character in the BBC series Parents of the Band
Jack Parker, a fictional character on the Australian soap opera Neighbours

See also
John Parker (disambiguation)